Cerithiopsis vicola is a species of sea snail, a gastropod in the family Cerithiopsidae, which is known from the Gulf of Mexico. It was described by Dall and Bartsch, in 1911.

Description 
The maximum recorded shell length is 2.9 mm.

Habitat 
Minimum recorded depth is 6 m. Maximum recorded depth is 6 m.

References

vicola
Gastropods described in 1911